The Hagerman Mansion is a historic house located at 610 North Cascade Avenue in Colorado Springs, Colorado.

Description and history 
Built by James John Hagerman in 1885. It was converted into luxury apartments in 1927.

It was added to the National Register of Historic Places on September 20, 1984.

References

Houses on the National Register of Historic Places in Colorado
Colorado State Register of Historic Properties
Buildings and structures in Colorado Springs, Colorado
Houses in El Paso County, Colorado
National Register of Historic Places in Colorado Springs, Colorado
Houses completed in 1885